Mallt-y-Nos (Matilda of the Night), also known as the Night Mallt, is a crone in Welsh mythology who rides with Arawn and the hounds (Cŵn Annwn) of the Wild Hunt, chasing sorrowful, lost souls to Annwn. The Mallt-y-Nos drives the hounds onward with shrieks and wails, which some say are evil and malicious in nature.

Others say that she was once a beautiful but impious noblewoman who loved hunting so much that she said, "If there is no hunting in heaven, I would rather not go!" She is said to have regretted making this wish, and now cries out 
in misery rather than joy as she hunts forever in the night sky.

References

External links
 

Welsh mythology